AB Bolinder-Munktell (BM) was a tractor and machines manufacturer founded in Eskilstuna, Sweden in 1932 through the merger of the mechanical companies  and .

Bolinder are also well known as manufacturers of 'Semi-Diesel' or 'Hot bulb' engines.

In 1950 BM was bought by AB Volvo. In 1973 the company changed its name to Volvo BM AB and then in 1995 to Volvo Construction Equipment.

The product range has changed with the times. Up to the beginning of the 20th century agricultural machines such as threshers were an important product.

Products

Marine engines
Bolinder produced a wide range of marine engines, mostly of the semi-diesel hot bulb type. Some of those sizes proved to be ideal in narrow boats, and some Bolinder motors are still in use for this purpose. When starting, the cylinder head has to be heated with a kerosene blowtorch to get the hot bulb heated, and to be able to start the combustion process.

Tractors
Tractor production commenced in 1913, with the type 30-40. Tractors were the main product up to the 1970s, and gained an unsurpassed reputation for durability.

Aircraft engines
During World War II, Bolinder-Munktell, at the request of the Swedish authorities, built Daimler-Benz DB601 aeroplane engines under licence. An entire underground factory at Eskilstuna was built to accommodate this factory. Owing to the superior reliability of the Swedish-built engines the Swedish airforce issued instructions that for two-engined aircraft, at least one engine should be a Swedish built unit.

Construction equipment
From the 1950s new products in the construction equipment and forestry machinery categories emerged. These were initially based on the tractor chassis. Soon the construction equipment became the dominant product range and remains so today. Products developed in the 1960s, and still in production, are wheel loaders and articulated haulers.

History 

Bolinder-Munktell traces its origins to the engineering workshops Munktells Mekaniska Verkstad AB (established in Eskilstuna by  Johan Theofron Munktell in 1832) and J. & C.G. Bolinders Mekaniska Verkstad AB (established in Stockholm by Jean and Carl Gerhard Bolinder  in 1845). In 1950 the main shareholder Handelsbanken sold its shares to Volvo who turned the company into a subsidiary.

See also 
 Bandvagn 202

References

External links 

Volvo Construction Equipment global history site

Agriculture companies of Sweden
Marine engine manufacturers
Manufacturing companies established in 1932
1932 establishments in Sweden